Krutinsky (masculine), Krutinskaya (feminine), or Krutinskoye (neuter) is the name of several inhabited rural localities (khutors, settlements, and villages) in Russia:
Krutinsky, Rostov Oblast, a khutor in Gornyatskoye Rural Settlement of Belokalitvinsky District of Rostov Oblast
Krutinsky, Volgograd Oblast, a khutor in Karagichevsky Selsoviet of Mikhaylovsky District of Volgograd Oblast
Krutinsky, Voronezh Oblast, a settlement in Khorolskoye Rural Settlement of Talovsky District of Voronezh Oblast
Krutinskaya, a village in Vagaysky Rural Okrug of Omutinsky District of Tyumen Oblast